James Robert Paternoster (27 January 1875 – 7 November 1954) was an Australian rules footballer who played with Fitzroy.

He served in World War I and was the brother of Matt Paternoster.

References

Sources

1875 births
1954 deaths
Australian rules footballers from Melbourne
Fitzroy Football Club players
Richmond Football Club (VFA) players
People from Berwick, Victoria
Australian military personnel of World War I
Military personnel from Melbourne